Tengréla Department (also spelled Tingréla) is a department of Bagoué Region in Savanes District, Ivory Coast. In 2021, its population was 141,761 and its seat is the settlement of Tengréla. The sub-prefectures of the department are Débété, Kanakono, Papara, and Tengréla. It is the northernmost department of Ivory Coast.

History
Tengréla Department was created in 1980 as a first-level subdivision via a split-off from Boundiali Department.

In 1997, regions were introduced as new first-level subdivisions of Ivory Coast; as a result, all departments were converted into second-level subdivisions. Tengréla Department was included in Savanes Region.

In 2011, districts were introduced as new first-level subdivisions of Ivory Coast. At the same time, regions were reorganised and became second-level subdivisions and all departments were converted into third-level subdivisions. At this time, Tengréla Department became part of Bagoué Region in Savanes District.

Notes

Departments of Bagoué
1980 establishments in Ivory Coast
States and territories established in 1980